British Rhondda Halt railway station served the area of Pont Walby, in the historical county of Glamorganshire, Wales, from 1906 to 1911 on the Vale of Neath Railway.

History 
The station was opened on 27 August 1906 by the Great Western Railway.

References 

Disused railway stations in Neath Port Talbot
Former Great Western Railway stations
Railway stations in Great Britain opened in 1906
Railway stations in Great Britain closed in 1911
1906 establishments in Wales
1911 disestablishments in Wales